Antispila hikosana is a moth of the family Heliozelidae. It was described by Kuroko in 1961. It is found in Japan (Kyushu).

The wingspan is 8–9 mm. The forewings are bronzy-fuscous with coppery reflections, becoming purplish reflections towards the apex. The basal area is shining dark leaden-fuscous and the markings are pale golden-metallic. The hindwings are pale fuscous with feeble purplish lusters. Adults appear from April to the beginning of May. There is one generation per year.

The larvae feed on Cornus controversa and Cornus brachypoda. They mine the leaves of their host plant. The mine has the form of a full depth linear-blotch. The linear mine extends along the leaf margin. It is pale greyish fuscous and the width gradually increases. The fourth instar larva creates a blotch mine which expands along or near
the leaf margin. Usually, one mine is found in a single leaf. The frass is blackish and is deposited in a row occupying the whole width of the gallery in the linear part of the mine. In the blotch mine, it is scattered irregularly. Larvae are found from the end of May to June. Full-grown larvae cut out a case and descend to the ground at the beginning of July. They hibernate within this case and pupate in spring of the following year.

References

Moths described in 1961
Heliozelidae
Moths of Japan